Conrad Burke (born March 1966) is an Irish physicist and entrepreneur.

Originally from Bray, County Wicklow, 

In 2005, Burke founded Innovalight, which developed silicon ink for use in solar energy technology and served as the president and CEO until August 2011, when DuPont acquired the company for about $60m. He was general manager of DuPont Innovalight, and is based in Silicon Valley, building new businesses in renewable energy, optical communications, nanomaterials, and biosciences. For three years, Conrad served on the board of SolarPower Europe - the European solar industry association.

Conrad is co-founder and managing partner of MetaVC Partners, a venture capital firm based in San Francisco. 
He is a recipient of the Technology Pioneer Award at the World Economic Forum and the Ernst & Young Entrepreneur of the Year Award.

Conrad Burke is the recipient of the 2022 UCD Alumni Award in Science

Education 
Conrad Burke received a BSc in Physics from University College Dublin in 1989 and an MSc in physics from Trinity College Dublin.

References 

1966 births
People from Bray, County Wicklow
Alumni of University College Dublin
Alumni of Trinity College Dublin
Living people